Konstantine Vardzelashvili (born 26 July 1972 in Tbilisi) is Vice-President of the Constitutional Court of Georgia. Prior to being appointed to the court, he was Deputy Minister of the Ministry of Justice. 1998-1999 – worked as Head of the program on protection of human rights, legal education and media development at the Liberty Institute.

References

Living people
1972 births
Jurists from Georgia (country)